The fourth season of the reality television series Basketball Wives LA aired on VH1 from July 12, 2015 until October 11, 2015. It follows the lives of a group of women who have all been somehow romantically linked to professional basketball players.

It was executively produced by Pam Healey, Sean Rankine, Amanda Scott, Shaunie O'Neal, Mark Seliga, and Lisa Shannon.

Production
Basketball Wives LA was revealed on June 20, 2011, with Kimsha Artest, Gloria Govan, Laura Govan, Jackie Christie and Imani Showalter as the cast. Malaysia Pargo and Draya Michele were announced as part of the cast in the series' July 2011 press release. Kimsha Artest stopped showing up for filming because she did not agree with the "shenanigans and drama", which explains why she was not featured in more than one episode. Tanya Williams was to be the eighth official "wife" but left the series after two episodes. The series premiered on August 29, 2011, to 1.81 million viewers.

Cast

Main
Malaysia Pargo: Wife of Jannero Pargo
Draya Michele: Girlfriend of Orlando Scandrick
Brandi Maxiell: Wife of Jason Maxiell
Mehgan James: Ex-Girlfriend of Kedrick Brown
Jackie Christie: Wife of Doug Christie
Shaunie O'Neal: Ex-Wife of Shaquille O’Neal

Recurring Cast
Tami Roman: Ex-Wife of Kenny Anderson
Angel Brinks: Ex-Girlfriend of Tyreke Evans
Patrice Curry: Wife of Eddy Curry

Episodes

References

2015 American television seasons
Basketball Wives